Hainan Tropical Ocean University (HTOU), formerly Qiongzhou University, is a provincial state-owned university in Hainan, China.

History
HTOU was previously named Qiongzhou University and had a single campus in Wuzhishan in the middle of Hainan island. It then opened a second campus in Sanya. At that time, its name changed from Qiongzhou University.

HTOU is the result of a number of schools merging over time. It was formed from the Guangdong Province's school named Hainan Li and Miao Autonomous Region Normal School established in 1954 and by Hainan Li and Miao Autonomous Prefecture Teachers’ College which was established in 1958. Further mergers and splits and name changes were made. Then, in 1993, it became the Qiongzhou College, a post-secondary education school, after a merger between Hainan Tongza Normal Post-secondary College and Hainan Tongza College of Education. In 2006, after further development and construction, it was renamed Qiongzhou University teaching undergraduate education. Hainan Normal School for Nationalities was merged into Qiongzhou University in 2006. In 2008, the main campus was established in Sanya. In September 2015, its became Hainan Tropical Ocean University.

Description
HTOU has two campuses: one in Sanya, and one in Wuzhishan. The total gross floor area is 385,800 square meters, which includes 171,400 square meters for teaching and administration. The total area of the two campuses is 133.33 hectares.

HTOU has a fixed-asset value of 894,453,700 RMB. The value of the teaching and scientific research facilities is 101,159,600 RMB. HTOU libraries have 342,800 electronic books and 1,277,100 paper books.

Students and faculty
There are 14,640 full-time students at HTOU. This includes 51 postgraduates, 11,354 undergraduates, 3,235 students of post-secondary programs, and 103 international students. These students are taught by 1,000 faculty members.

Courses
HTOU now has 12 schools that offer the following:

1 MTA (Master of Tourism Administration) program
44 undergraduate programs and 12 post-secondary programs

HTOU teaches 9 fields:

Agriculture
Education
Engineering
History
Law
Liberal Arts
Management
Philosophy
Sciences

See also
List of universities and colleges in Hainan
List of universities in China
Higher education in China

References

External links
Official website

Maritime colleges in China
Universities and colleges in Hainan
Sanya
1977 establishments in China
Educational institutions established in 1977